Eusi Kwayana, formerly Sydney King (born 4 April 1925), is a Guyanese politician. A cabinet minister in the People's Progressive Party (PPP) government of 1953, he was detained by the British Army in 1954. Later he left the PPP to form ASCRIA (African Society for Cultural Relations with Independent Africa), a Pan-Africanist grassroots political group that, after a brief flirtation with the People's National Congress (PNC) of Forbes Burnham, fused into the Working People's Alliance (WPA). Kwayana is also a playwright.

Biography
He was born in Lusignan, British Guiana (now Guyana), and his family moved to Buxton when he was aged seven. He became a primary school teacher at the age of 15. In 1956 he founded and became principal of County High School, later renamed Republic Cooperative High School, in Buxton.

During the 1940s he began to be politically active at the village level. Around 1947 (at that time known as Sydney King), he became a member of a small group of politicians, led by Cheddi Jagan, who formed the People's Progressive Party (PPP). After the PPP won in Guyana's first election under universal adult suffrage, Kwayana became Minister of Communication and Works. After the British government suspended the constitution and threw the PPP out of office, in October 1953, Kwayana and others were made political detainees for fear that they would cause civil unrest. He was an executive member of both the PPP and subsequently the People's National Congress (PNC).

Kwayana met his wife Tchaiko Kwayana (formerly Ann Cook), a pan-Africanist, and civil rights activist from Georgia, in 1968, as she was travelling from Brazil back to the US. They married in 1971 in Georgetown with Yoruba rites and was involved in Kwayana's organizational building.

Kwayana co-founded the African Society for Racial Equality (ASRE), and later, the African Society for Cultural Relations with Independent Africa (ASCRIA), which in 1974 became part of the Working People's Alliance (WPA). He was a member of the WPA's collective leadership and worked closely with the late Walter Rodney.

He is the author of several books, including Next Witness, The Bauxite Strike and the Old Politics, Scars of Bondage, Guyana: No Guilty Race, Buxton in Print and Memory, Morning After, Genesis of a Nation: The Indo-Guyanese Contribution to Social Change (in Guyana) and Walter Rodney: His Last Days and Campaigns. Kwayana also wrote the lyrics of the party songs of Guyana's three leading policial parties, the PPP, PNC and WPA.

A production of his play The Promised Land, performed by a young cast from Buxton, won the "Best Play" Prize in the Youth Category at the British Guiana Drama Festival of 1965.

In 2002, he retired from parliament and moved to California in the United States. As of March 2021, he lives in Atlanta, Georgia.

Selected bibliography
 2009: Walter Rodney: His Last Days and Campaigns. R. Ferdinand-Lalljie Publishers.
 2014: The Bauxite Strike and Old Politics. Atlanta: On Our Own Authority! Publishing. 
 2016: A New Look At Jonestown: Dimensions from a Guyanese Perspective, Carib House.

References

External links
Brief history of the Working People's Alliance
Eusi Kwayana's music
"Eusi Kwayana - the librettist of Guyana’s political opera or the political musician", Stabroek News, 27 July 2003.
"Ashton Chase and Eusi Kwayana contributed greatly to the freedom struggle in this country", Stabroek News, 22 March 2011.
Guyana will reconcile or recede (2016 interview)

1925 births
Afro-Guyanese people
Guyanese dramatists and playwrights
Guyanese non-fiction writers
Guyanese pan-Africanists
Living people
People from Demerara-Mahaica
People's Progressive Party (Guyana) politicians
Working People's Alliance politicians